Belt Creek is a tributary, approximately 80 mi (129 km) long, of the Missouri River in western Montana in the United States.

It originates in the Lewis and Clark National Forest north of Big Baldy Mountain, in the Little Belt Mountains in western Judith Basin County.  It flows northwest through mountainous canyons (Limestone Canyon) past Monarch, through Sluice Boxes State Park, and flows through Armington and Belt.  It finally joins the Missouri  approximately 15 mi (25 km) northwest of Great Falls of the Missouri.

It is named for the Little Belt Mountains, which it flows through.

See also

List of rivers of Montana
Montana Stream Access Law

Notes

Rivers of Montana
Tributaries of the Missouri River
Rivers of Cascade County, Montana
Rivers of Chouteau County, Montana